Sir Bruce Joseph Forsyth-Johnson  (22 February 1928 – 18 August 2017) was a British entertainer and presenter whose career spanned more than 70 years. Forsyth came to national attention from the late 1950s through the ITV series Sunday Night at the London Palladium. He went on to host several game shows, including The Generation Game, Play Your Cards Right, The Price Is Right and You Bet!. He co-presented Strictly Come Dancing from 2004 to 2013. In 2012, Guinness World Records recognised Forsyth as having the longest television career for a male entertainer.

Early life
Forsyth was born on Victoria Road in Edmonton, Middlesex, on 22 February 1928, the son of Florence Ada (née Pocknell) and John Thomas Forsyth-Johnson. His family owned a car repair garage and, as members of the Salvation Army, his parents played brass instruments; his mother was a singer.

His great-grandfather Joseph Forsyth Johnson was a landscape architect who worked in multiple countries, and great-great-great-great-grandfather William Forsyth (1737–1804) was a founder of the Royal Horticultural Society and the namesake of the plant genus Forsythia.

Following the outbreak of the Second World War, Forsyth was evacuated to Clacton-on-Sea. Shortly after he arrived, Forsyth's parents allowed him to return to London as a result of his feeling homesick. In 1943, Forsyth's older brother John, who served as a pilot in the Royal Air Force, was killed during a training exercise at RAF Turnberry. Forsyth attended the Latymer School. After watching Fred Astaire in films at the age of eight, he trained in dance in Tottenham and then Brixton.

Career

Boy Bruce, the Mighty Atom
Forsyth started his live public performances aged 14, with a song, dance and accordion act called Boy Bruce, the Mighty Atom. His first appearance was at the Theatre Royal in Bilston, with The Great Marzo at the top of the bill. He had made his television debut in 1939 as a child, singing and dancing on BBC talent show Come and Be Televised, broadcast from Radiolympia and introduced by Jasmine Bligh.

Post-war work
After the war, with the goal of joining Moss Empires theatres, he spent years on stage with little success and travelled the UK working seven days a week, doing summer seasons, pantomimes and circuses, where he became renowned for his strong-man act. His act was interrupted by national service when he was conscripted into the Royal Air Force at the age of 19, which he later reflected taught him "respect and discipline".

In 1958, an appearance with the comedian Dickie Henderson led to his being offered the job of compère of Val Parnell's weekly TV variety show, Sunday Night at the London Palladium. He hosted the show for two years, followed by a year's break, then returned for another year. His schedule of stage performances, which continued throughout the 1960s, forced him to give up the job of host.

Forsyth appeared in the London production of Little Me, along with Avril Angers in 1964. In the musical film Star! (1968), a biopic of stage actress Gertrude Lawrence, he played alongside lead performer Julie Andrews as Lawrence's father.

In January 1968 Pye Records issued as a single "I'm Backing Britain", supporting the campaign of the same name, written by Tony Hatch and Jackie Trent, and sung by Forsyth. The chorus included "The feeling is growing, so let's keep it going, the good times are blowing our way". All involved in making the single took cuts in their fees or royalties so that the single sold for 5s. instead of the going rate of 7s. 4½d. Forsyth happily endorsed the campaign, saying "The country has always done its best when it is up against the wall. If everyone realises what we are up against we can get out of trouble easily." The song did not make the charts, selling only 7,319 copies.

On 7 October 1968, he was top of the bill on the opening night of the Golden Garter nightclub, Wythenshawe. Two years later, he played Swinburne in the Disney fantasy film Bedknobs and Broomsticks. In 1976, he appeared on The Muppet Show, where he took on the duo Statler and Waldorf.

Game show host
During his spell of hosting Sunday Night at the London Palladium as part of the show he hosted the 15-minute game show Beat the Clock. Forsyth's next success was The Generation Game (BBC1, 1971–1977, 1990–1994), which proved popular and attracted huge Saturday evening audiences. It was on this show that Forsyth introduced his "The Thinker" pose, emulating Rodin's sculpture, appearing in silhouette each week after the opening titles. This pose is reminiscent of the circus strong-man attitude. He also wrote and sang the theme for the show "Life is the Name of the Game." Millions of viewers became familiar with the rasp of Forsyth's north London accented voice and his "distinctively pointy" chin that he emphasised in poses such as the "human question mark", with chin over raised knee. He was replaced on The Generation Game by Larry Grayson.

In 1977 he announced that he was leaving television to take the star role in a new musical, The Travelling Music Show, based on the songs of Anthony Newley and Leslie Bricusse. The show did reasonably well in provincial theatre, but received poor reviews when it moved to London and it closed after four months in July 1978.

London Weekend Television persuaded him to return to the screen later that year to present Bruce Forsyth's Big Night, a two-hour Saturday-night show on ITV encompassing a variety of different entertainment formats (later reduced to 90 minutes). However, the show was not a success and lasted for just one series. Forsyth remained with ITV, hosting the game show Play Your Cards Right, which was the UK version of the US original Card Sharks, from 1980 to 1987, 1994 to 1999, and a brief period from 2002 to 2003, before the show was cancelled mid-run due to low ratings.

In 1986, he went to the United States to host a game show on ABC, Bruce Forsyth's Hot Streak, which ran for 65 episodes from January to April that year. Forsyth starred in the Thames Television sitcom Slinger's Day in 1986 and 1987, a sequel to Tripper's Day which had starred Leonard Rossiter, whom Forsyth replaced in the new show. He was the original host of You Bet! (1988 to 1990).

Forsyth fronted the third version of The Price Is Right (1995 to 2001). His unsuccessful gameshows include Takeover Bid (1990 to 1991), Hollywood Or Bust (1984), and Didn't They Do Well! (2004). During the 1970s Forsyth featured in the Stork margarine adverts on television, and then during the 1980s and 1990s he appeared in an advertising campaign for the furniture retailer Courts, in which he dressed as a judge.

Forsyth celebrated his 70th birthday in 1998 and appeared in a week-long run of his one-man show at the London Palladium. In 2000, Forsyth hosted a revived series called Tonight at the London Palladium.

Career revival
In 2003, and again in 2010, Forsyth was a guest presenter on the news and satire quiz show Have I Got News for You. Forsyth had called Paul Merton, one of the team captains on the show, to suggest himself as a guest presenter. He co-presented Strictly Come Dancing from 2004 to 2013, formally stepping down from hosting the regular live show in April 2014. This decision was made to reduce his workload and for the preparation of pre-recorded specials.

On 7 April 2010, Forsyth became one of the first three celebrities to be subjected to the British version of the American institution of a comedy roast, on Channel 4's A Comedy Roast. Forsyth was the subject of the BBC genealogy series Who Do You Think You Are?, broadcast on 19 July 2010. On 20 March 2010, Forsyth appeared on the autobiography-interview programme Piers Morgan's Life Stories, which was broadcast on ITV.

In 2011, Forsyth released a collection of songs on CD called These Are My Favourites. He chose the songs for their personal and musical importance, including a duet with his granddaughter, Sophie Purdie. These Are My Favourites also includes a recording of "Paper Moon" with Nat King Cole.

Tributes and honours

Forsyth's showbiz awards include Variety Club Show Business Personality of the Year in 1975; TV Times Male TV Personality of the Year, in 1975, 1976, 1977 and 1978; and BBC TV Personality of the Year in 1991.

On 7 June 1959 Forsyth was inducted into the elite entertainers' fraternity, the Grand Order of Water Rats, Water Rat number 566.

In 1987, a fan club was created – the Great Bruce Forsyth Social Club. They would later go on to assist Forsyth in singing his opening number, "It's Never Too Late", at his Audience With show. He repaid this favour by adding the society to his busy schedule in June 1997 and appeared at their 10th annual general meeting in Plymouth.

Forsyth was appointed Officer of the Order of the British Empire (OBE) in the 1998 Birthday Honours, and Commander of the Order of the British Empire (CBE) in the 2006 New Year Honours.

On 27 February 2005, the BBC screened A BAFTA Tribute to Bruce Forsyth to mark the entertainer's 60 years in show business. He had a bronze bust of himself unveiled at the London Palladium in May 2005. The sculpture was created by his son-in-law and is on display in the theatre's Cinderella Bar.

In 2008, Forsyth received the BAFTA Fellowship. In 2009, he was awarded the Theatre Performer's Award at the annual Carl Alan Awards. Hosted by the International Dance Teachers' Association, the awards are voted for by the leading dance organisations in the United Kingdom and recognise those who have made an exceptional contribution to the world of dance and theatre.

Forsyth received a Royal Television Society Lifetime Achievement Award on 17 March 2009. On 26 January 2011 he received the National Television Awards special recognition award.

Forsyth was made a Knight Bachelor in the 2011 Birthday Honours for services to entertainment and charity. This followed a years-long public campaign to award him a knighthood. His investiture, by the Queen, took place on 12 October 2011 and he became Sir Bruce Forsyth CBE.

In July 2012, Forsyth was given the honour of carrying the Olympic flame through London, as it finally reached the city on the penultimate day of the London 2012 Torch Relay.

Forsyth earned a place in the 2013 Guinness Book of World Records as the male TV entertainer having had the longest career, calling it a "wonderful surprise". He also appeared at the 2013 Glastonbury Festival on the Avalon stage, becoming the oldest performer to ever play at the festival. In 2018 the NTAs honoured the memory of Sir Bruce by naming an NTA award after him.

Personal life
Forsyth was married to Penny Calvert from 1953 until their divorce in 1973, with whom he had three daughters named Debbie, Julie, and Laura. Julie is a songwriter, who composed the UK’s entry in the 1988 Eurovision Song Contest.

In 1973, he married Anthea Redfern, the hostess on The Generation Game. They had two daughters named Charlotte and Louisa, before divorcing in 1979. Asked to judge the 1980 Miss World competition, Forsyth met Puerto Rican beauty queen Wilnelia Merced, who was the 1975 winner and a fellow judge. They were married from 1983 until his death in 2017. They had one son together named Jonathan Joseph (who is better known as "JJ"). By his six children, Forsyth had nine grandchildren and three great-grandchildren.

Forsyth was a supporter and ambassador for the children's charity Caudwell Children, regularly appearing at many of their fundraising events.

Forsyth lived on the Wentworth Estate in Surrey. Until 2000, he also occupied a flat in Nell Gwynn House, Sloane Avenue, Chelsea.

Politics

In August 2014, Forsyth was one of 200 public figures who signed a letter to The Guardian expressing their hope that Scotland would vote to remain part of the United Kingdom in September's referendum on that issue.

Illness and death
Towards the end of his life, Forsyth suffered from ill health, which reduced his appearances in public. On 8 October 2015, he was admitted to hospital for cuts and minor concussion after tripping over a rug at his home and hitting his head. A month later, he made his last full TV appearance on Strictly Children in Need Special, with filming for this taking place prior to him undergoing surgery for an abdominal aortic aneurysm on 12 November. As a result of his surgery, Forsyth was unable to host that year's Strictly Come Dancing Christmas Special as planned, but a spokesman representing him later stated he would play a part in the production, recording a special video message for it.

After 2015, Forsyth made no further public appearances, as his health began to decline, with his wife commenting that he struggled to move easily following his surgery. On 26 February 2017, he was again admitted to hospital with a severe chest infection and spent five days in intensive care, before returning home on 3 March 2017.

On 18 August 2017, Forsyth died of bronchial pneumonia at his Wentworth Estate home in Virginia Water, aged 89. Several celebrities paid tribute to Forsyth following his death, including his former Strictly Come Dancing co-host Tess Daly; his friends Michael Parkinson, Jimmy Tarbuck, and Des O'Connor, the BBC director general Tony Hall and the then Prime Minister, Theresa May. BBC One aired Sir Bruce Forsyth – Mr Entertainment, in place of the scheduled The One Show, in tribute. Forsyth was cremated on 5 September 2017 in a private ceremony attended only by close family and friends.

A few days later, on 9 September 2017, when that year's series of Strictly Come Dancing began, it paid tribute to Forsyth with a special ballroom dance routine from their professional dancers. On 14 December 2017, the BBC announced that it would produce a tribute show to Forsyth at the London Palladium on 21 February 2018. Hosted by Tess Daly, Sir Bruce: A Celebration was broadcast on BBC One on 11 March 2018. On 18 August 2018, exactly a year after he died, Forsyth's ashes were laid to rest beneath the stage at the London Palladium in a private ceremony.

Filmography

Film and television

Stage

Discography

Albums

Singles
1959, "Excerpts from The Desert Song (No.2)", with June Bronhill, Edmund Hockridge, Inia Te Wiata, The Williams Singers, Michael Collins and His Orchestra (7-inch EP), His Master's Voice: 7EG 8676
1960, "I'm a Good Boy", Parlophone
 1960, "I'm in Charge" (7-inch), Parlophone: 45-R 4535	
 1962, "The Oh-Be-Joyfuls (7-inch), Piccadilly: 7N.35086		
 1964, "Real Live Girl" (7-inch), Pye: 7N.15744		
 1964, "Saturday Sunshine" (7-inch), Piccadilly: 7N.35169	
 1964, "The Mysterious People" (7-inch), Piccadilly: 1189	
 1965, "Real Live Girl" (7-inch), Blue Cat: BC 105	
 1968, "I'm Backing Britain" / "There's Not Enough Love in the World", Pye	
 1973, "Didn't He Do Well?" (7-inch), Philips: 6006 285
 1978, "Love Medley", with Valerie Walsh (7), CBS: S CBS 6469

In popular culture
Neopets, a virtual pet website, had a collectible character which was originally a direct representation of Forsyth himself. The pet was later renamed to just "Bruce" and his appearance changed to that of a penguin to better fit with the other pets on the platform. Despite the change, the pet retained Forsyth's iconic bow tie.

Footnotes

References

External links

Bruce Forsyth at the British Film Institute

1928 births
2017 deaths
20th-century British comedians
21st-century British comedians
20th-century Royal Air Force personnel
Actors awarded knighthoods
BAFTA fellows
BBC television presenters
British entertainers
British game show hosts
British male film actors
British male television actors
British people of Scottish descent
British television personalities
British television presenters
Commanders of the Order of the British Empire
Deaths from bronchopneumonia
Deaths from pneumonia in England
Knights Bachelor
People educated at The Latymer School
People from Edmonton, London
People from Virginia Water
Singers awarded knighthoods
Strictly Come Dancing
Television personalities from London